Three Hands in the Fountain is a 1997 historical mystery crime novel by Lindsey Davis and the ninth book of the Marcus Didius Falco Mysteries series.  Set in Rome between August and October, AD 73, the novel stars Marcus Didius Falco, informer and imperial agent. The title alludes to the song "Three Coins in the Fountain" as well as to the macabre discovery which triggers Falco's investigation.

Plot summary

Falco arrives home in Rome with Helena Justina and Julia Junilla Laeitana, his new baby daughter, and barely have time to settle in before being subjected to a welcome-home party. Falco and Petronius sneak out for a drink in a nearby street next to a fountain, which is not working. When a worker turns up to clean it, it is revealed that a severed hand had blocked the aqueduct. Falco and Petro start to investigate, but their case is stolen by Anacrites. Petro puts up a sign proclaiming that awards are to be given on the discovery of any body parts. Falco talks to his brother-in-law and is told that severed body parts have been discovered in the rivers and aqueducts for several years, usually after festivals. When he's told that Petro put up the sign he runs back to his old apartment (where Petro now lives after being kicked out by his wife) as a slave hands over a new hand to Petro. Petro takes down the sign.

Anacrites, who is rather annoyed at being muscled out of his stolen case, sends four men to beat up Falco and Petro. They defeat the bruisers easily and trail them back to Anacrites. Soon afterwards, Julius Frontinus finds and gives over a new hand. It looks the same as the other hands but this one has a wedding ring with two names inscribed (Asinia and Caius). They track down Caius Cicurrus, the widower of Asinia. He is innocent and is greatly grieving for his lost wife. Petro's wife dumped him after he took up with Balbina Milvia from Time to Depart. Milvia's husband Florius sends men to beat up Falco and Petro. Falco, with the help of his trainer Glaucus and Glaucus's trainees, beats off his attackers but Petro has no such help and is heavily injured. Milvia comes to Falco asking him to help her, as she fears that her mother, who has vanished, has been taken by the killer. Falco finds Cornella Flaccida at a new apartment. He goes out to the country but finds no suspects. After continuous reconnaissance he has two problems: First, Claudia Rufina, the heiress from A Dying Light In Corduba and the new fiancee to Helena's brother Aelianus, has vanished, and second, a slave called Thurius has been identified as the murderer. Falco goes out to rescue Claudia and apprehend Thurius. He captures Thurius and finds his lair and his victim. He finds that it's not Claudia, it's Milvia's mother, who vanished again. Unlike Claudia, however, no one liked her enough to send out a search party. Claudia is later found to have eloped with Helena's other brother Justinus, an act that has disastrous consequences. The book ends with Falco telling Petro his wife went out with another man, and later receiving a visit from Anacrites.

Characters in Three Hands in the Fountain

Friends and family 
 Anacrites - Imperial spy
 Arria Silvia - Wife of L. Petronius Longus
 Camillus Aelianus - Eldest son of Decimus Camillus Verus
 Camillus Justinus - Youngest son of Decimus Camillus Verus
 Claudia Rufina - Betrothed to Aelianus
 Decimus Camillus Verus - Senator and father of Helena Justina
 Fusculus - Member of Petronius' enquiry team
 Gaius - Falco's Nephew
 Helena Justina - Wife of Falco, and daughter of the Senator Decimus Camillus Verus
 Julia Junilla Laeitana - Infant daughter of Falco and Helena.
 Julia Justa - Wife of Camillus Verus and mother of Helena
 Junilla Tacita - Mother of Falco
 Lollius - Father of Gaius
 Lucius Petronius Longus - Enquiry chief in the XIII region and friend of Falco
 Marcus Didius Falco - Informer and Imperial Agent.
 Marcus Rubella - Tribune of the Fourth Cohort of vigiles
 Marina - Ex-lover of Falco's brother, Festus
 Martinus - Deputy
 Scythax - Doctor
 Sergius - Punishment officer

Suspects, victims and others 
 Asinia - Wife of Caius Cicurrus
 Aurelia Maesia - Daughter of Rosius Mundus
 Balbina Milvia - Daughter of Balbinus, former Crime Boss
 Bolanus - Assistant to Statius
 Caius Cicurrus - Corn Chandler
 Cordus - Slave
 Cornella Flaccida - Wife of Balbinus
 Damon - Driver
 Florius - Husband of Milvia
 Mundus - Pia's lover
 Pia - Friend of Asinia
 Rosius Gratus - Old man
 S. Julius Frontinus - Former Consul
 Statius - Engineer
 Thurius - Servant

Major themes
 Investigation into the murder and mutilation of Roman women during the Games,
 Developing relationship of Marcus Didius Falco and Helena Justina.

Allusions/references to actual history, geography and current science
 Set in Rome in AD 73, during the reign of Emperor Vespasian. 
 Sextus Julius Frontinus was a Roman soldier, politician, engineer and author, who was appointed superintendent of the aqueducts (curator aquarum) at Rome in AD 95.
 Helena playfully suggests that she and Marcus buy the farmhouse near Tibur (modern-day Tivoli) they are using as a base for their investigations; Marcus retorts that no one with any taste or sense would want to own land in that area.  This appears to be an inside joke, since they are located near the site where the Emperor Hadrian built his famous villa in the 2nd Century AD.

Release details
 1997, UK, Century Hardback 
 1998, UK, Arrow, Paperback 
 1999, UK, Chivers Press, Large Print, 
 1999, US, Mysterious Press, Hardback 
 2000, US, Warner Books, Paperback

References

External links 
lindseydavis.co.uk Author's Official Website

1997 British novels
Marcus Didius Falco novels
Historical novels
73
Arrow Books books